M16 is a family of military rifles.

M16 or M-16 may also refer to:

Firearms and military
 M16 mine, an American landmine
 BOV M16 Miloš, a Serbian 4x4 multipurpose armoured vehicle
 Flammenwerfer M.16., a German First World War flamethrower
 Fokker M.16, a 1915 German biplane
 , a First World War Royal Navy M15-class monitor
 Grigorovich M-16, a Russian World War I–era biplane flying boat
 Stahlhelm, a German World War I helmet
 M16 (rocket), an American artillery rocket of World War II and the Korean War
 M16 Multiple Gun Motor Carriage, an American self-propelled anti-aircraft weapon

Transportation

Aerospace 
 John Bell Williams Airport, in Raymond, Mississippi
 Magni M-16 Tandem Trainer, an Italian autogyro introduced in 2000
 Macchi M.16, an Italian biplane built in 1919
 Miles M.16 Mentor, a 1930s British monoplane 
 Progress M-16, a Russian spacecraft

Surface Vehicles 
 M16 (New York City bus), a former New York City Bus route in Manhattan
 M Scow (M-16), a 16-foot sailboat
 McLaren M16, a IndyCar race car
 Midland M16, a Formula One car run by Midland F1 in 2006

Roads 
 M16 (East London), a Metropolitan Route in East London, South Africa
 M16 (Cape Town), a Metropolitan Route in Cape Town, South Africa
 M16 (Johannesburg), a Metropolitan Route in Johannesburg, South Africa
 M16 (Pretoria), a Metropolitan Route in Pretoria, South Africa
 M16 (Durban), a Metropolitan Route in Durban, South Africa
 M16 (Bloemfontein), a Metropolitan Route in Bloemfontein, South Africa
 M-16 (Michigan highway), now part of U.S. Route 16
 M16 motorway, former designation for parts of the M25 in England
 M-16 motorway (Pakistan), also known as the Swat Expressway
 M16 Road (Zambia)
 Highway M16 (Ukraine)

Other uses
 M-16 (album), from German band Sodom
 Messier 16, a nebula also called the Eagle Nebula and its associated star cluster
 M16, a postcode in the M postcode area that covers part of Greater Manchester, England

See also 
 M16C, a model of microcontroller
 MI6, with a capital "I" instead of the digit "1", the British Secret Intelligence Service